Josiah Quincy II (February 23, 1744April 26, 1775) was an American lawyer and patriot. He was a principal spokesman for the Sons of Liberty in Boston prior to the Revolution and was John Adams' co-counsel during the trials of Captain Thomas Preston and the soldiers involved in the Boston Massacre.

Family
Quincy was the son of Col. Josiah Quincy I and the father of the Harvard president and Boston mayor Josiah Quincy III. He was a descendant of Edmund Quincy, who emigrated to Massachusetts in 1633. His first cousin once removed was Dorothy Quincy, wife of Governor John Hancock. He was also a distant relative of John Quincy Adams through the sixth President's mother, Abigail Smith Adams.

Life
Quincy was born in Boston in 1744, to Col. Josiah Quincy and Hannah Sturgis Quincy. In 1756, shortly after the death of his mother, he moved with his father and other siblings to their ancestral homestead in Braintree. In 1763, he graduated  Harvard, and began studying law in the office of Oxenbridge Thacher (died 1765), a top Boston attorney, whose practice he would take over in 1765. A gifted orator, in 1766 he delivered an impassioned address in English "on liberty," or as others would recall it, on the meaning of being "a patriot," at Harvard's commencement upon receiving his Masters. The speech caught the attention of Boston's patriot leadership, and by 1767, he was contributing regularly to Samuel Adams' Boston Gazette.

Published initially under the name "Hyperion", his essays were notable for their colorful rhetoric and denouncement of British oppression.

On February 12, 1770, he published in the Gazette a call to his countrymen "to break off all social intercourse with those whose commerce contaminates, whose luxuries poison, whose avarice is insatiable, and whose unnatural oppressions are not to be borne 

He used the signatures Mentor, Callisthenes, Marchmont Needham, Edward Sexby, &c., in later letters to the Boston Gazette.

After the Boston Massacre (March 5, 1770) he and John Adams defended Captain Preston and the accused soldiers and secured their acquittal. Prosecuting the case were Robert Treat Paine and Josiah's older brother Samuel Quincy, who shortly after was named solicitor general.

He traveled for his health in the South in 1773, and left in his journal an interesting account of his travels and of society in South Carolina; this journey was important in that it brought Southern patriots into closer relations with the popular leaders in Massachusetts.

Perhaps seeking to enhance his standing in advance of the selection of delegates to the First Continental Congress, in May 1774 he published Observations on the Act of Parliament, commonly called The Boston Port Bill, with Thoughts on Civil Society and Standing Armies, in which he urged patriots and heroes to form a compact for opposition and for vengeance.

In September 1774 he secretly left for England, where he argued the American cause to British politicians who were sympathetic to the colonies.

On March 16, 1775, he started back, but he died of tuberculosis on April 26, 1775, on a boat within sight of the Massachusetts shore.

See also
Quincy political family

References

Sources

External links

Massachusetts lawyers
Harvard University alumni
Quincy family
Members of the Universalist Church of America
1744 births
1775 deaths
18th-century American lawyers
18th-century Christian universalists
18th-century deaths from tuberculosis
Lawyers from Boston
People from Braintree, Massachusetts
People of Massachusetts in the American Revolution
People from colonial Boston
People of colonial Massachusetts
Tuberculosis deaths in Massachusetts